Martin Temenliev (born 7 September 1985) is a Bulgarian footballer who plays as a goalkeeper for Chernomorets Burgas.

References

Bulgarian footballers
1985 births
Living people
FC Chernomorets Balchik players
FC Pomorie players
PFC Beroe Stara Zagora players
FC Sozopol players
First Professional Football League (Bulgaria) players
Association football goalkeepers